Sadleria is a genus of six species of ferns in the family Blechnaceae, all endemic to Hawaii.

Taxonomy

Georg Friedrich Kaulfuss distinguished the genus in 1824 based on samples of S. cyatheoides acquired by Adelbert von Chamisso in 1821. Chamisso had been serving as the naturalist for a Russian scientific expedition led by Otto von Kotzebue aboard the vessel Rurick. Kaulfuss named the genus after Joseph Sadler (1791–1849), a Hungarian naturalist studied European ferns.

Species
, the Checklist of Ferns and Lycophytes of the World accepted the following species:
Sadleria cyatheoides Kaulf. (amaumau fern or rasp fern)
Sadleria pallida Hook. & Arn.
Sadleria souleyetiana (Gaudich.) Moore
Sadleria squarrosa (Gaudich.) T.Moore
Sadleria unisora (Baker) Rob.
Sadleria wagneriana D.D.Palmer & Flynn

The Halemaumau crater on Kīlauea is named after S. cyatheoides.

References

Citations

Bibliography
 .

External links

Blechnaceae
Endemic flora of Hawaii
Native ferns of Hawaii
Fern genera